Ákos Kecskés (born 4 January 1996) is a Hungarian professional footballer who plays as a centre back for Austrian club LASK.

Club career
On 29 July 2021, he signed a two-year contract with Russian Premier League club Nizhny Novgorod.

On 4 August 2022, Kecskés joined LASK in Austria on a contract until 2026.

International career
On 1 June 2021, Kecskés was included in the final 26-man squad to represent Hungary at the rescheduled UEFA Euro 2020 tournament.

Career statistics

International

References

External links
 
  
  
 

1996 births
People from Hódmezővásárhely
Sportspeople from Csongrád-Csanád County
Living people
Hungarian footballers
Hungary youth international footballers
Hungary under-21 international footballers
Hungary international footballers
Association football defenders
Újpest FC players
Bruk-Bet Termalica Nieciecza players
Korona Kielce players
FC Lugano players
FC Nizhny Novgorod (2015) players
LASK players
Nemzeti Bajnokság I players
Ekstraklasa players
2. Liga Interregional players
Swiss Super League players
Russian Premier League players
Austrian Football Bundesliga players
UEFA Euro 2020 players
Hungarian expatriate footballers
Expatriate footballers in Italy
Expatriate footballers in Poland
Expatriate footballers in Switzerland
Expatriate footballers in Russia
Expatriate footballers in Austria
Hungarian expatriate sportspeople in Italy
Hungarian expatriate sportspeople in Poland
Hungarian expatriate sportspeople in Switzerland
Hungarian expatriate sportspeople in Russia
Hungarian expatriate sportspeople in Austria